Queeristan is a book written by Parmesh Shahani. The book was published in 17 August 2020 by Westland Books.

Reception 
Moneycontrol Review write about the book "The author covers various aspects of framing diversity and inclusion policies, finding talent from the LGBTQ community, creating a recruitment process that is LGBTQ friendly, creating an LGBTQ-friendly work culture at the workplace, and how to be an ally, whether you identify as LGBTQ or not."

SheThePeopleTv said "Shahani alludes to these practices of tokenism in the book, about how these gestures are empty if changes are not brought about in institutional policies."

References 

2020 non-fiction books
LGBT literature in India
2020s LGBT literature
Westland Books books